Emmanuel Strosser (born 4 May 1965 in Strasbourg), the son of theatre director Pierre Strosser, is a French classical pianist.

Biography 
Strosser first studied with Hélène Boschi then at the Conservatoire de Paris with Jean-Claude Pennetier and Christian Ivaldi.
He is a piano teacher at the Conservatoire de Paris and a professor of chamber music at the Conservatoire national supérieur de musique et de danse de Lyon.
Emmanuel Strosser is the author of an important discography, particularly in chamber music: Gabriel Fauré's two quintets with the Rosamonde Quartet, and the Slavonic Dances by Antonín Dvořák for piano four hands with Claire Désert among others.

References

External links 
 Emmanuel Strosser on Sartory
 Emmanuel Strosser on France Musique
 Emmanuel Strosser on Opéra de Paris
 Emmanuel Strosser on Mirare
 Emmanuel Strosser à la Folle Journée de Nantes 2015 on YouTube

20th-century French male classical pianists
21st-century French male classical pianists
Academic staff of the Conservatoire de Paris
Musicians from Strasbourg
1965 births
Living people